Sri Lanka won the 3 match series 1-0 and 4 limited overs matches, one of which was the Bungle in the jungle.

Sri Lanka won the Test series by winning 1 of the 3 matches with 2 drawn:
 1st Test (Galle International Stadium) – match drawn 
 2nd Test (Asgiriya Stadium, Kandy) – match drawn 
 3rd Test (Sinhalese Sports Club Ground, Colombo) – Sri Lanka won by an innings and 215 runs

One Day Internationals (ODIs)

1st ODI

2nd ODI

3rd ODI

Test series summary

1st Test

2nd Test

3rd Test

Tour matches

One-day: Sri Lanka Cricket President's XI v England XI

First-class: Sri Lanka Cricket President's XI vs England XI

2003 in English cricket
2003 in Sri Lankan cricket
2003-04
International cricket competitions in 2003–04
Sri Lankan cricket seasons from 2000–01